The Ministry of Health and Family Welfare (Sbāsthya ō paribār kalyāṇ Montronaloya) is a Bangladesh government ministry charged with health policy in Bangladesh. It is also responsible for all government programs relating to family planning in Bangladesh. The present minister is Zahid Maleque.
The Ministry of Health and Family Welfare contains two divisions: Health Service Division and Medical Education And Family Welfare Division.

Departments

Health Service Division
Bangladesh National Nutrition Council
Disease International Centre for Diarrhoeal Disease Research, Bangladesh
Department of Drug Administration
Directorate General of Nursing and Midwifery
Bangladesh Nursing and Midwifery Council
Health Economics Unit
Health Engineering Department
Bangladesh Institute of Child and Mother Health

Medical Education And Family Welfare Division
National Institute of Population Research and Training
Directorate General of Family Planning

See also
Government of Bangladesh
Cabinet of Bangladesh

References

External links 
 Welcome to Ministry of Health and Family Welfare

 
Health and Family Welfare
Medical and health organisations based in Bangladesh
Bangladesh, Health and Family Welfare
Bangladesh, Health and Family Welfare